The Attorney General of Kansas is a statewide elected official responsible for providing legal services to the state government of Kansas. Kris Kobach assumed office on January 9, 2023.

Divisions
 Criminal Justice
 Civil Litigation
 Consumer Protection
 Concealed Carry
 Kansas Bureau of Investigation
 Legal Opinions and Government Counsel
 Kansas Solicitor General Unit
 Medicaid Fraud Unit

Office holders

Kansas Territory Attorneys General

State Attorneys General

References

External links
 
 Kansas Attorney General Opinions at Washburn University website
 Attorney General publications at Kansas Government Information (KGI) Online Library
 List of Kansas Attorneys General with short biographical information, provided by Kansas Historical Society

1854 establishments in Kansas Territory